Huimilpan is the seat of Huimilpan Municipality of the state of Querétaro. It is part of the Sierra Queretana, and sometimes included in the Metropolitan Area of Querétaro. It has an alpine weather, and is home to the Otomí people.

Populated places in Querétaro